The 2022 NCAA Division I women's soccer tournament was the 41st edition of the NCAA Division I Women's Soccer Tournament, a postseason tournament to determine the national champion of NCAA Division I women's college soccer. The College Cup was played on December 2 and December 5 at WakeMed Soccer Park in Cary, North Carolina.

Florida State was the defending National Champion and were unable to defend their title after falling to North Carolina in the Semifinals.  North Carolina would go on to lose in overtime in the final to  2–3.  The title was UCLA's second in program history and was the first under head coach Margueritte Aozasa.  Aozasa became the first coach in NCAA women's soccer history to win the title in her first year as head coach.

Qualification 

All Division I women's soccer programs are eligible to qualify for the tournament. 28 teams received automatic bids by winning their conference tournaments, 3 teams received automatic bids by claiming the conference regular season crown (Ivy League, Pac-12 Conference, and West Coast Conference don't hold conference tournaments), and an additional 33 teams earned at-large bids based on their regular season records.

Bracket
The bracket was announced on Monday, November 7, 2022. First round games were played on November 11, 12 or 13 at campus sites.

Florida State Bracket

* Host institution

Schedule

First round

Second round

Round of 16

Quarterfinals 

Rankings from United Soccer Coaches Final Regular Season Rankings

Notre Dame Bracket

* Host institution

Schedule

First round

Second round

Round of 16

Quarterfinals 

Rankings from United Soccer Coaches Final Regular Season Rankings

UCLA Bracket

* Host institution

Schedule

First round

Second round

Round of 16

Quarterfinals 

Rankings from United Soccer Coaches Final Regular Season Rankings

Alabama Bracket

* Host institution

Schedule

First round

Second round

Round of 16

Quarterfinals 

Rankings from United Soccer Coaches Final Regular Season Rankings

College Cup

Schedule

Semi-finals

Final 

Rankings from United Soccer Coaches Final Regular Season Rankings

Record by conference 

The R32, S16, E8, F4, CG, and NC columns indicate how many teams from each conference were in the Round of 32 (second round), Round of 16 (third round), Quarterfinals (Elite Eight), Semi-finals (Final Four), Championship Game, and National Champion, respectively.
The following conferences failed to place a team into the round of 32: Atlantic 10, America East, ASUN, Big Sky, Big South, CAA, C-USA, Horizon, MAAC, MAC, Missouri Valley, Mountain West, Northeast, Ohio Valley, Patriot, SoCon, Southland, Summit League, Sun Belt, and SWAC. These conference's records have been consolidated in the "Other" row.

Statistics

Goalscorers

See also 
 2022 NCAA Division I men's soccer tournament

References 

NCAA Division I Women's Soccer Championship
2022 NCAA Division I women's soccer season
NCAA Division I
Women's soccer in the United States
NCAA 2022
2022